The Louisiana House of Representatives is the lower house in the Louisiana State Legislature, the state legislature of the U.S. state of Louisiana. This chamber is composed of 105 representatives, each of whom represents approximately 42,500 people (2000 figures). Members serve four-year terms with a term limit of three terms (twelve years). The House is one of the five state legislative lower houses that has a four-year term, as opposed to the near-universal two-year term.

The House convenes at the State Capitol in Baton Rouge.

Leadership

The Speaker of the House presides over the House of Representatives. The speaker is customarily recommended by the governor (although this is not in House rules), then elected by the full House. In addition to presiding over the body, the speaker is also the chief leadership position, and controls the flow of legislation and committee assignments. The Louisiana House of Representatives also elects a speaker pro tempore to preside in the absence of the Speaker.

The current speaker is Republican Clay Schexnayder, who was elected to that position in 2020. His deputy is the speaker pro tempore, currently Republican Tanner Magee who was also elected to the position in 2020. The speaker pro tempore presides when the Speaker is not present.

Composition 
The Louisiana House of Representatives comprises 105 representatives elected from across the state from single-member districts by registered voters in the district. Representatives must be electors, be at least eighteen years old, be domiciled in the district they represent at least one year, and have resided in the state two years. It is the judge of its members' qualifications and elections. All candidates for state representative in a district compete in a nonpartisan blanket primary; if no candidate earns 50+1 percent of the vote, the top two vote-getters advance into the general election. Elections occur every four years and representatives are limited to three four-year terms (12 years). If a seat is vacant, it will be filled in a special election. Its sessions occur along with the Louisiana State Senate, every year, for sixty legislative days in even-numbered years and forty-five legislative days in odd-numbered years in which only monetary bills can be considered. It is the lower legislative chamber of the Louisiana State Legislature; the upper house is the Louisiana State Senate. The Louisiana House has sole authority to impeach state officials and introduce appropriation bills. The Louisiana House of Representatives was established, along with its functions and authority, in Article III, Section 3 of the Louisiana Constitution.

Party membership

Members

Committee assignments
The committees of the Louisiana House review proposed bills and either kill them or recommend their passage to the full house. Each committee has a specialized area it oversees. Committees can call upon state officials to testify at committee meetings. Committee memberships, including chairmanships and vice chairmanships, are assigned by the Speaker.

Past composition of the House of Representatives

See also
List of speakers of the Louisiana House of Representatives
Louisiana State Capitol
Louisiana State Legislature
Louisiana Senate

References

External links
Louisiana House of Representatives
House district maps
Membership in the Louisiana House of Representatives, 1812–2024
2012–2016 House Orientation Guide
In The Loop Official Blog of the Louisiana House of Representatives

State lower houses in the United States
Louisiana State Legislature